Logan Township is a township in Marion County, Kansas, United States.  As of the 2010 census, the township population was 104.

Geography

Cities and towns
The township contains the following settlements:
 No cities of unincorporated communities.

Cemeteries
The township contains the following cemeteries:
 Beltz Cemetery (a.k.a. "Early" Mennonite Brethren Church Cemetery), located in Section 34 T17S R1E.
 Elm Springs Bible Hall Cemetery, located in Section 17 T17S R1E.
 Friedesthal Cemetery (a.k.a. Central Heights Cemetery) (a.k.a. Peace Valley Cemetery), located in Section 21 T17S R1E.
 Kaiser Cemetery (a.k.a. "Early" Congregational Church Cemetery), located in Section 36 T17S R1E.
 Logan Cemetery (a.k.a. Morning Star Cemetery), located in Section 13 T17S R1E.

References

Further reading

External links
 Marion County website
 City-Data.com
 Marion County maps: Current, Historic, KDOT

Townships in Marion County, Kansas
Townships in Kansas